Habib al-Rahman al-'Azmi was born in Maunath Bhanjan, Mau district (Uttar Pradesh), India. He completed the formal education from Mau in 1922 and began teaching. He is known for his scholarly work on Hadith and Fiqh.

Services
His works may be divided in three categories:

 Editing of rare manuscripts of Hadith
 Original and independent works
 Polemical works

He helped to bring the Musannaf of Abd al-Razzaq al-San'ani back to attention within the Muslim world.

The works which fall into first category include:

 Kitab al-Zuhd wa’l-Raqa’iq of ‘Abd-Allah ibn Mubarak (d.181 A.H.)
 Sunan of Sa’id ibn Mansur (d. 227 A.H.)
 Musnad of Imam Humaydi (d. 219 A.H.)
 Musannaf of ‘Abd al-Razzaq (d. 211 A.H.) 
 Musannaf of Ibn Abi Shaybah (d. 235 A.H.)
 al-Matalib al’Aliyah of Ibn Hajar Al-‘Asqalani (d.752 A.H.)
 Majma ‘Bihar-al-Anwar of Tahir Patni (d. 986 A.H.)
 al-Targhib wat-Tarhib by Mundhiri (d. 656 A.H.)

His polemical work in Urdu include:

 Raka’at al-Tarawih, A’lam Marfu’ah and Shari’ Haqiqi.

His Urdu books include:

 A’yan al-Hujjaj in two volumes, provides crisp and insightful accounts of scholar-pilgrims.
 Dastakar Ahl-i Sharaf (published in 1406 A.H.) deals with the biographies of men of eminence distinction who were weavers by profession.

Legacy
Although various research scholars have made Habib al-Rahman the title of their thesis, one thesis of M.Phil. standard has been written about him. Masood Ahmad Azmi wrote ‘‘Hayat abul Ma'asir Allama Habib al-Rahman al-Azmi (حیات ابو المآثر علامہ حبیب الرحمن الاعظمی)’’ in two volumes. It has been published by Madrassa Mirqatul Uloom, Mau. It is over and about 1500 pages and discusses various aspects of the life of Maulana Azmi. Abdel-Halim Mahmoud gave him the title of "The Greatest Scholar of The Islamic World" ("اکبر علماء العالم الاسلامی").

References

External links 
 Habib al-Rahman al-'Azmi: Life and works (Biography)

Hanafis
Maturidis
Deobandis
Hadith scholars
Muslim scholars of Islamic jurisprudence
Indian Sunni Muslims
People from Mau
1901 births
1992 deaths
People from Azamgarh district